Grigore Grigoriu (April 4, 1941 in Căuşeni, Tighina County – December 20, 2003 in Palanca village, Ștefan Vodă) was an actor from the Republic of Moldova, known especially for interpreting the role of horse thief Luiku Zobar from the movie "Gypsies Are Found Near Heaven" (1975).

Biography 
Grigore Petrovich Grigoriu was born in 1941 in Căușeni, Moldova. In school, Grigore played in the theater, practiced sports, including boxing. After graduation, he worked briefly as a porter at a railway.

Grigore Grigoriu began his artistic career in the Bălți National Theatre where he worked for six years, from 1959 to 1965. Subsequently, he worked for five years in the TV-theater "Dialogue", after 1970 at the Republican Theater of the Young Spectator "Luceafarul".

His first film role was Sawa Milchan in the 1966 film by Emil Loteanu "Red Glades". Grigore Grigoriu acted in Russia, Romania, Germany, Azerbaijan, and Ukraine, performed more than seventy roles in film and theater. The most famous of his roles is Loiko Zobar in the film Gypsies Are Found Near Heaven.

Grigore Grigoriu was killed in a car accident on December 20, 2003 near the Moldovan village of Palanca. The actor is buried in the Central (Armenian) cemetery in Chișinău.

Partial filmography 

 Rasuna valea (1950) - Cupletist
 Red Glades (1966) - Savva Milciu
 Gorkie zyorna (1966)
 Marianna (1967)
 Annychka (1968) - Andrei
 Bratya Karamazovy (1969)
 Ofitser zapasa (1972) - Barbu
 Lăutarii (1972) - Radu Negostin
 Zemlya, do vostrebovaniya (1973) - Toscano
 Posledniy gaiduk (1973)
 Queen of the Gypsies (1975) - Loiko Zobar
 Night Over Chile (1977) - Manuel Valdivia
 Ich will euch sehen (1978) - Kommissar Ardatow
 A Hunting Accident (1978) - Polikhroniy Kalidis
 Anton the Magician (1978) - Sergeant
 Agent of the Secret Service (1978)
 Pugachev (1979) - Chika Zarubin
 Qariba adam (1979) - Vakil Ahmad
 Ya khochu pet (1979)
 The Gadfly (1980)
 Na Granatovykh ostrovakh (1981)
 Where Has Love Gone? (1981) - Viktor
 Romance with Amelie (1982) - Panzerkommandant
 U chertova logova (1982) - Gruya
 Naydi na schastye podkovu (1983)
 Anna Pavlova (1983, TV Series) - Mikhail Mordkin
 Kak stat znamenitym (1984)
 The Morning Star (1987)
 Maria și Mirabella în Tranzistoria (1989)
 Vdvoyom na grani vremeni (1989) - (final film role)

References

External links

 
 Web-enciclopedia filmului moldovenesc – Grigore Grigoriu
Grigore Grigoriu's Biography, Filmography

1941 births
2003 deaths
Road incident deaths in Moldova
Moldovan male film actors
Soviet male film actors
Romanian people of Moldovan descent